Corbin Waller (born March 26, 1985 in High Point, North Carolina) is a former American soccer player.

Career

College and amateur
Waller attended High Point Central High School and youth soccer with the PSA Stars before going on to play four years of college soccer at the College of Charleston. He was his college's first choice goalkeeper as a senior in 2006, when he led the conference in total saves (87) and was second in saves per game (4.35).

Professional
Undrafted out of college, Waller spent a year out of the competitive game before he signed with Houston Dynamo of Major League Soccer in March 2008, but never made a first team appearance for the club and was released at the end of the season.

Waller joined Charlotte Eagles of the USL Second Division in 2009, but spent his entire first season on the bench without a single minute of playing time. He made his professional debut on May 22, 2010, keeping a clean sheet in a game against the Real Maryland Monarchs.

References

External links
Charlotte Eagles profile

1985 births
Living people
American soccer players
College of Charleston Cougars men's soccer players
Houston Dynamo FC players
Charlotte Eagles players
USL Second Division players
Soccer players from North Carolina
Association football goalkeepers